Claus Martínez (born 18 December 1975) is a Bolivian cyclist. He competed in the men's sprint at the 1996 Summer Olympics.

References

1975 births
Living people
Bolivian male cyclists
Olympic cyclists of Bolivia
Cyclists at the 1996 Summer Olympics
Place of birth missing (living people)